Barbary or Barbary Coast or Barbary states is the term used by Europeans from the 16th century until the 19th century to refer to the coastal regions of what are now Morocco, Algeria, Tunisia, and Libya.

Barbary may also refer to:

People
 Barrie Barbary (born 1939), former Australian rules footballer
 Craig Barbary (born 1960), former Australian rules footballer
 Cyriel Barbary (1899-2004), last known Belgian veteran of the First World War
 Red Barbary (Donald Odell Barbary, 1920-2003), American MLB player
 Miss Barbary, a fictional character in the 1852-53 novel Bleak House by Charles Dickens

Natural history
 Barbary bulbul (Pycnonotus barbatus), a species of bird
 Barbary dove (Streptopelia risoria), a species of bird
 Barbary duck or Muscovy duck (Cairina moschata), a species of bird
 Barbary falcon (Falco pelegrinoides), a species of bird
 Barbary fig (Opuntia ficus-indica), a species of cactus
 Barbary ground squirrel (Atlantoxerus getulus), a species of rodent
 Barbary horse or Barb or Berber horse, a northern African breed of horse
 Barbary lamb, a legendary zoophyte, once believed to grow sheep as its fruit
 Barbary leopard (Panthera pardus panthera), a subspecies
 Barbary lion, a Panthera leo leo population in North Africa that is regionally extinct today
 Barbary macaque or Barbary ape or magot (Macaca sylvanus), a species
 Barbary macaques in Gibraltar
 Barbary nut (Moraea sisyrinchium), a species of flowering plant
 Barbary ostrich (Struthio camelus camelus), a subspecies of bird
 Barbary partridge (Alectoris barbara), a species of bird
 Barbary sheep (Ammotragus lervia) a species of caprid (goat-antelope)
 Barbary skipper (Muschampia mohammed), a species of butterfly
 Barbary stag (Cervus elaphus barbarus), a subspecies of red deer
 Barbary striped grass mouse (Lemniscomys barbarus), a species of rodent 
 Barbary striped hyena (Hyaena hyaena barbara), a subspecies
 Campanian Barbary, a breed of domestic sheep

Other
 Barbary (novel), a 1986 science fiction novel by Vonda McIntyre
 Barbary Company, a trading company established by Queen Elizabeth I of England in 1585
 Barbary Crusade, a 1390 Franco-Genoese military expedition against the Barbary pirates
 Barbary Lane, a fictionalised version of Macondray Lane, San Francisco created by Armistead Maupin in Tales of the City
 Barbary organ, another name for barrel organ
 Barbary pirates or Barbary corsairs, Ottoman and Maghrebis pirates and privateers who operated from North Africa
 Barbary slave trade
 Slavery on the Barbary Coast
 Barbary treaties, between the United States of America and the Barbary States
 Barbary Wars, a series of conflicts that culminated in two wars fought between the United States, Sweden, and the Barbary states
 First Barbary War (1801–1805)
 Second Barbary War (1815)
 Third Barbary War, a 2011 multi-state NATO-led military intervention in Libya

See also
 Barbari (disambiguation)
 "Barbary Allen", an alternative title of the song "Barbara Allen"
 Barbary Coast (disambiguation)
 Barbary Pirate (film), a 1949 American swashbuckler film
 Barbary Sheep (film), a 1917 American silent film
 Barbary Shore, a 1951 novel by Norman Mailer
 Epitafium dla Barbary Radziwiłłówny, a 1982 Polish historical film
 "Proposals for concerted operation among the powers at war with the Pyratical states of Barbary", a 1786 letter by Thomas Jefferson